38 Studios, LLC (also known as Green Monster Games, LLC) was an American entertainment and video game development company founded in 2006 by Major League Baseball player Curt Schilling and named for his jersey number. Originally based in Massachusetts, the company moved to Rhode Island as part of securing a $75 million loan guarantee from that state's quasi-public Economic Development Corporation (EDC). In February 2012, the company released its only title, Kingdoms of Amalur: Reckoning, a single-player action role-playing video game for several platforms. The game received positive reviews and sold an estimated 330,000 copies in its first month, rising to 1.2m copies in the first 90 days. 38 Studios shut down a few months later. The failure of the controversial Rhode Island loan spurred investigations by the news media and the government.

History
During a family holiday gathering in December 2005, Schilling approached his wife's uncle, Bill Thomas, a retired business executive, with the idea to start a video game company. He was interested in building a new massively multiplayer online role-playing game (MMORPG) dubbed Project Copernicus, a type of game that Schilling frequently played and enjoyed. In 2006, Schilling announced his plans to six of his gaming friends while chatting online, asking them, "I'm seriously contemplating starting a gaming company. Who else is in?"

He recruited these six friends, Thomas, author R. A. Salvatore and author/artist Todd McFarlane to join his venture. In 2006, the company leased  of office space in downtown Maynard, Massachusetts, at the historic old mill building then called Clock Tower Place. A press release formally announced the creation of Green Monster Games (GMG) in September 2006.The President and CEO of the company was Brett Close, and the CTO was Jon Laff, formerly of Electronic Arts.

At the start of spring training in 2007, the company was renamed from Green Monster Games to 38 Studios to give a "... more accurate reflection of what our company is working to achieve." Contrary to popular belief, Schilling has stated that the company's original name was not taken from the Green Monster wall in Fenway Park. He is quoted on the Fires of Heaven Guild message boards, posting under his EverQuest (an MMORPG) character's name, Ngruk, saying, "The GMG name was—and I know this is going to be impossible to believe—not named after the left-field wall at Fenway. The name was made up by someone who knew next to nothing about baseball and isn't even from this country."

In 2008, the company hired Travis McGeathy, a former lead designer for Sony Online Entertainment's EverQuest. On May 27, 2009, 38 Studios acquired Rise of Nations developer Big Huge Games from THQ, a California-based video game developer and publisher. On August 21, 38 Studios announced that CEO Brett Close had left the company, and Jennifer MacLean, former SVP of Business Development, had been named the new CEO.

Although no games had yet been released, in July 2010, the Rhode Island Economic Development Corporation (EDC) approved a $75 million loan guarantee to 38 Studios, who in exchange, had committed to bring 450 jobs to the state by the end of 2012. On November 3, 2010, 38 Studios announced the completion of the $75 million financing package in conjunction with the Rhode Island EDC, and their planned relocation to Providence, Rhode Island, in early 2011. On April 8, 2011, relocation began, and on April 12, 160 employees began working in the new space, exceeding agreed upon job creation and relocation milestones.

At this point, the company was simultaneously developing two initial products. The first, Kingdoms of Amalur: Reckoning, a single-player game, was developed by the company's Big Huge Games subsidiary, to be published by Electronic Arts. It was introduced to the public at the 2010 San Diego Comic-Con International convention, and released in North America on February 7, 2012, and in Europe on February 10. The game enjoyed moderate success. The second title, code-named Copernicus, was a massively multiplayer game developed by the Maynard/Providence studio.  Author R. A. Salvatore created over ten thousand years of backstory for the Amalur intellectual property, and Todd McFarlane provided art direction for both products.

The second game, the MMORPG, was still in development when the company declared bankruptcy.

Bankruptcy
On May 14, 2012, the Providence Journal reported that Rhode Island Governor Chaffee had met with 38 Studios regarding their financial situation, and hinted at financial difficulties:
While Chafee strongly criticized the idea of the loan guarantee for the former Boston Red Sox pitcher's company while he ran for office in 2010, he has since said it's important now to work with it and make sure it succeeds...."We're doing everything possible, like I would for any Rhode Island company," he said Monday afternoon at the State House, adding that the work at stake is "keeping 38 Studios solvent."
The state of Rhode Island became concerned over 38 Studios' finances after the company defaulted on a $1.125 million loan payment on May 1, when a check was returned due to insufficient funds, and asked for further help from the state. The second payment attempt by the studio on May 18, seventeen days past the initial due date   and in the form of a $1,025,000 wire transfer and a $100,000 personal check from an unnamed source, was successful.

However, 38 Studios consequently was unable to make payroll that week. Keith Stokes, executive director of Rhode Island Economic Development Corporation turned in his resignation, which was accepted by the governor on May 16. WPRI reported that both CEO Jennifer MacLean and Senior Vice President of Product Development John Blakely had indicated that they had left the company; MacLean dated her departure to March 2012, when she took a leave of absence.

On May 24, 2012, 38 Studios officially declared bankruptcy, ceasing operations and laying off its entire staff and that of Big Huge Games via a mass email. Schilling publicly addressed the studio's failure on Boston radio station WEEI, revealing that he never took a salary and ended up losing his entire personal fortune of $50 million. "I'm tapped out. ... I put everything in my name in this company. But I'm not asking for sympathy. That was my choice."

The Rhode Island State Police, the attorney general's office, the U.S. Attorney’s Office, and the FBI began investigations into the company on June 6, 2012, a day before 38 Studios filed for Chapter 7 bankruptcy. 
On May 19, 2014, WPRI reported that some studio executives from 38 Studios knew that the money they accepted from the Rhode Island EDC was not enough to finish development on Project Copernicus.

In March 2016, the Securities and Exchange Commission (SEC) became involved in the matter, charging both Rhode Island Commerce Corporation as well as Wells Fargo with securities fraud, specifically noting that the two companies were aware that the $75 million loan was not enough for 38 Studios to finish work on Project Copernicus but failed to notify bond investors of the risk.  Rhode Island Commerce settled with the SEC for a $50,000 civil penalty on March 29, 2017.  In a separate administrative proceeding, the SEC settled with First Southwest Company for $192,400. The lawsuit with Wells Fargo continued until January 2019, when lawyers for both the SEC and the bank had announced a settlement agreement with undisclosed terms, pending approval by the court.

An investigation by the Rhode Island State Police did not come up with sufficient evidence to file criminal charges against the studio. However, civil litigation continued, ultimately leading to gross settlements with Schilling and other defendants of approximately $61 million. The settlements have left the state of Rhode Island paying approximately $28 million on the bonds.

The settlements were obtained as Rhode Island Commerce Corporation (formerly Rhode Island EDC) engaged the law firm Wistow Sheehan & Loveley PC and filed a lawsuit in November 2012 against Schilling, Stokes, financial advisors, and other backers of 38 Studios. The state's economic development agency settled with defendants Moses Afonso Ryan Ltd. and Antonio Afonso Jr. for $4.4 million on June 27, 2014; with defendants Adler Pollock & Sheehan PC, Robert Stolzman, J. Michael Saul, and Keith Stokes for $12.5 million on August 7, 2015; with Wells Fargo Securities LLC and Barclays Capital Inc. for $25.675 million on August 23, 2016; with Curt Schilling, Thomas Zaccagnino, Richard Wester, and Jennifer MacLean for $2.5 million on September 9, 2016; and with Hilltop Securities Inc. (formerly First Southwest Company) for $16 million on February 1, 2017.

In October 2013, Big Huge Games founders Brian Reynolds and Tim Train revived their studio after reacquiring the trademark at an auction held by the Rhode Island state government. The studio released the mobile strategy game DomiNations in 2015 and was acquired by Nexon the following year.

THQ Nordic announced in September 2018 that it had acquired the intellectual property assets from 38 Studios, including Kingdoms of Amalur and Project Copernicus. THQ Nordic announced a remastered version of Kingdoms of Amalur planned for August 2020.  Kingdoms of Amaulur: Re-Reckoning released on 8th September 2020.

Former 38 Studios employees began receiving portions of their due salaries in August 2021, expected to range between 14 and 20 percent of what they were to make prior to bankruptcy.

Games developed
 Kingdoms of Amalur: Reckoning – February 7, 2012
 Project Copernicus (MMO) – Cancelled

References

External links
 Official website via Internet Archive
 End Game: Inside the Destruction of Curt Schilling's 38 Studios By Jason Schwartz Boston Magazine, August 2012, long article on company collapse.

Video game development companies
Video game companies established in 2006
Video game companies disestablished in 2012
Defunct video game companies of the United States
Video game controversies
Defunct companies based in Rhode Island
Companies based in Providence, Rhode Island
2006 establishments in Massachusetts
2012 disestablishments in Rhode Island
Companies that filed for Chapter 11 bankruptcy in 2012
Companies that have filed for Chapter 7 bankruptcy